Vladislav Habal (born April 2, 1991) is a Czech professional ice hockey goaltender. He is currently a free agent having last played for HC Slovan Bratislava of the Tipsport Liga.

Habal previously played 43 games in the Czech Extraliga for HC Karlovy Vary from 2013 to 2016. He then moved to Slovakia to sign for HC Košice on June 6, 2016. After three seasons with Košice, Habal joined fellow Tipsport Liga side HC Slovan Bratislava on July 21, 2019.

References

External links

 

1991 births
Living people
HC Baník Sokolov players
HC Benátky nad Jizerou players
Czech ice hockey goaltenders
HC Dukla Jihlava players
Sportovní Klub Kadaň players
HC Karlovy Vary players
HC Košice players
HC Most players
People from Sokolov
HC Slovan Bratislava players
HC Slovan Ústečtí Lvi players
Sportspeople from the Karlovy Vary Region
Czech expatriate ice hockey players in Slovakia